Tuskar Rock is a group of rocks topped by a lighthouse  off the southeast coast of County Wexford, Ireland. The rocks have probably destroyed more ships than any other Irish coastal feature. One hundred and seventy-six wrecks are listed for the Tuskar Rock area at Irish Wrecks Online.

In October of that year, a storm struck, washing away temporary barracks that had been erected on the island, and killing fourteen workmen—the worst such disaster in Ireland's history of lighthouse construction. The surviving workers clung to the island's slippery rocks for two full days before being discovered and rescued. Work resumed, and the lighthouse was completed, entering into operation on 4 June 1815.

The Tuskar Rock air disaster occurred near the rock on 24 March 1968 when Aer Lingus flight 712, en route from Cork to London, crashed into the sea with the loss of all 61 people on board.

The name Tuskar rock has no foundation in the Irish language but actually came from the Vikings. It is one of many Viking place names found in the south of Wexford and means simply large (tu) rock (skar) in Old Norse.

Tuskar lighthouse is mentioned in John Masefield's ballad The Yarn of the Loch Achray as the place where the clipper Loch Achray dropped her tug, before sailing to the South Atlantic where she was wrecked off the River Plate.

Demographics

See also

 List of islands of Ireland
 List of lighthouses in Ireland
 Coastal landforms of Ireland
 Commissioners of Irish Lights

References

Lighthouses in the Republic of Ireland
Uninhabited islands of Ireland
Islands of County Wexford
Lighthouses on the National Inventory of Architectural Heritage